Art Baker  may refer to:

 Art Baker (actor) (1898–1966), American film, television and radio actor
 Art Baker (coach) (born 1929), former American football coach
 Art Baker (gridiron football) (born 1937), former American football player

See also
Arthur Baker (disambiguation)